Up On the Roof: Songs from the Brill Building is a cover album and also the twenty-first studio album released in 1993 by Neil Diamond on Columbia Records. It contains a duet with Dolly Parton, string arrangements by David Campbell, along with re-makes of tracks associated with the Brill Building, where Diamond had worked in the 1960s.

It was certified Gold by the Recording Industry Association of America.

Track listing

Personnel 

Musicians and Vocals
 Neil Diamond – lead vocals
 Robbie Buchanan – keyboards (1, 2, 4, 7, 8, 9, 11, 12, 13, 16), acoustic piano (14, 15)
 Jim Cox – Wurlitzer electric piano (3, 5), Hammond B3 organ (10), bass (12)
 Bill Payne – acoustic piano (5, 14, 16)
 Bob Mann – guitar (1, 3, 4, 5, 7-15)
 Dean Parks – guitar (2, 7, 13, 16)
 David King – guitar (6)
 Louis Gutierrez – guitar (6)
 Doug Livingston – pedal steel guitar (14)
 Larry Klein – bass (1, 2, 3), additional bass (12)
 Bob Glaub – bass (4, 5, 7-16)
 Chris Wagner – bass (6)
 Carlos Vega – drums (1, 2, 3, 5, 10, 12, 13, 14)
 Russ Kunkel – drums (4, 7, 8, 9, 11, 15)
 James Bradley, Jr. – drums (6)
 Peter Asher – percussion (1, 5, 11, 12, 13, 16), marimba (12)
 Michael Fisher  – percussion (4, 8, 10, 11)
 M.B. Gordy – timpani (6), vibraphone (11)
 Bill Bergman – saxophone (3, 5, 10, 16), sax solo (3)
 Don Markese – clarinets (3, 5, 10, 16), flutes (3, 5, 10, 16), saxophone (3, 5, 10, 16)
 Lon Price – saxophone (3, 5, 10, 16)
 Brandon Fields – alto saxophone (4)
 Greg Smith – bass saxophone (13)
 Nick Lane – trombone (3, 5, 10, 16)
 Wayne Bergeron – trumpet (3, 5, 10, 16)
 Dennis Farias – trumpet (3, 5, 10, 16)
 Oscar Brashear – trumpet (12)
 Gavyn Wright – concertmaster 
 Isobel Griffiths – musical contractor
 Dolly Parton – lead vocals (1)
 Rosemary Butler – backing vocals (1, 3, 5, 10, 16)
 Wendy Fraser – backing vocals (1, 3, 5, 10, 16)
 Portia Griffin – backing vocals (1, 3, 5, 10, 16)
 Raven Kane – backing vocals (1, 3, 10, 16), vocal contractor 
 Andrea Robinson – backing vocals (1, 3, 5, 10, 16)
 Julia Waters – backing vocals (1, 3, 5, 10, 13, 16)
 Maxine Waters – backing vocals (1, 3, 5, 10, 16)
 Terry Wood – backing vocals (1, 3, 10, 16)
 Carmen Twillie – backing vocals (1, 3, 5, 10, 16)
 Valerie Carter – backing vocals (4, 11, 13)
 Kate Markowitz – backing vocals (4, 11, 13)
 Laura Satterfield – backing vocals (4, 5, 11)
 Donna Davidson – backing vocals (5)
 Stephanie Spruill – backing vocals (5)
 Julie Ritter – backing vocals (6)
 Gretchen Seager – backing vocals (6)
 Josef Powell – backing vocals (13)
 Oren Waters – backing vocals (13, 15)
 Randy Crenshaw – backing vocals (14, 15)
 Jon Joyce – backing vocals (14, 15)
 Gene Morford – backing vocals (14, 15)
 Jerry Whitman – backing vocals (14, 15)
 Roger Freeland – backing vocals (15)
 Donny Gerrard – backing vocals (15)
 John Hendricks – backing vocals (15)
 Steve Lively – backing vocals (15)
 Rick Logan – backing vocals (15)

Arrangements
 Peter Asher – rhythm arrangements (1-6, 8, 10-16), orchestral arrangements (2), BGV arrangements (5)
 The Neil Diamond Band – rhythm arrangements (1, 3, 4, 5, 10, 11, 13, 14, 16)
 David Campbell – orchestral arrangements (1-4, 8, 10-16), orchestra conductor (1, 3, 4, 7-16), BGV arrangements (1, 3, 4, 10-16), horn arrangements (3, 5, 16), rhythm arrangements (8), arrangements (9)
 Mary's Danish – rhythm arrangements (6)
 Alan Lindgren – arrangements (7)
 The Ten Lonely Guys – rhythm arrangements (15)

Production 
 Producer – Peter Asher
 Production Coordinator – Ivy Skoff 
 Production Assistant – Cathy Kerr
 Recorded and Mixed by Frank Wolf
 Additional Engineer – Bernie Becker 
 Assistant Engineers – Jeff Foster, Nathaniel Kunkle, Gil Morales, Jeff Orchard, Marnie Riley, Brian Soucy and Brett Swain.
 Recorded at Conway Studios and Arch Angel Studios (Los Angeles, CA); Air Lyndhurst Hall (London, England, UK).
 Mixed at Conway Studios
 Edited by Tom Hensley
 Mastered by George Marino at Sterling Sound (New York, NY).
 Project Coordinator – Sam Cole 
 Art Direction – David Kirschner 
 Design – Jan Weinberg 
 Assistant Design – Barbara Lebow
 Cover Photo – Eugene Adabari
 Photography – David Attie, BMI Photo Archives, Impact Photos and Michael Ochs Photos.
 Liner Notes – Neil Diamond

References
[ All Music Guide entry]

Neil Diamond albums
1993 albums
Albums produced by Peter Asher
Covers albums
Columbia Records albums